Erwin A. Heers (born July 4, 1896) was an American college football and basketball player and coach. He served as the head football coach at Alfred University in Alfred, New York from 1926 to 1929. He also served as the freshmen football coach at Rider University in 1931. The school had no varsity team that year.

References

1896 births
Year of death missing
Alfred Saxons athletic directors
Alfred Saxons football coaches
Alfred Saxons men's basketball coaches
Basketball coaches from New York (state)
Rider Roughriders football coaches
Syracuse Orange football coaches
Syracuse Orange football players
People from Wellsville, New York